Awan is a surname, and may refer to: 
Malik Shakeel Awan, Pakistani politician
Ahmad Nadeem Qasmi (1916–2006), Pakistani writer and critic
Ahmed Ali Awan, convicted of the murder of Ross Parker
Akil N. Awan, British academic
Ameer Muhammad Akram Awan, Pakistani scholar
Babar Awan, Pakistani statesman
Dildar Awan, Pakistani cricketer
Ameer Muhammad Akram Awan, Pakistani religious leader
Firdous Ashiq Awan, Pakistani physician and politician
Ghulam Farooq Awan, Pakistani lawyer
Hanif Awan, Pakistani politician
Imran Awan, American technology aide
Imran Awan (cricketer), Pakistani born American cricketer
Malik Munawar Khan Awan, Pakistani officer
Malik Shakir Bashir Awan, Pakistani politician
Madut Kon Awan, South Sudanese politician
Malik Shakeel Awan, Pakistani politician
Muhammad Huzair Awan, Pakistani Information Technology (IT) prodigy
Muhammad Safdar Awan, Pakistani politician
Paul Malong Awan, South Sudanese politician
Samina Awan, British actress

Arabic-language surnames